Papuascincus buergersi  is a species of skink, a lizard in the family Scincidae. The species is endemic to Papua New Guinea.

Etymology
The specific name, buergersi, is in honor of German zoologist Theodore Joseph Bürgers (1881–1954).

Geographic range
P. buergersi is found in the Sepik River basin, Papua New Guinea.

Behavior
P. buergersi is terrestrial.

Reproduction
P. buergersi is oviparous.

References

Further reading
Allison A, Greer AE (1986). "Egg Shells with Pustulate Surface Structures: Basis for a New Genus of New Guinea Skinks (Lacertilia: Scincidae)". Journal of Herpetology 20 (1): 116–119. (Papuascincus buergersi, new combination).
Greer AE (1974). "The generic relationships of the Scincid lizard genus Leiolopisma and its relatives". Australian Journal of Zoology, Supplemental Series 22 (31): 1–67. (Lobulia buergersi, new combination).
Smith MA (1937). "A Review of the Genus Lygosoma (Scincidae: Reptilia) and its Allies". Records of the Indian Museum 39 (3): 213–234. (Emoia buergersi, new combination, p. 227).
Vogt T (1932). "Beitrag zur Reptilienfauna der ehemaligen Kolonie Deutsch-Neuguinea". Sitzungsberichte der Gesellschaft Naturforschender Freunde zu Berlin 5–7: 281–294. (Lygosoma buergersi, new species, p. 292). (in German).

Papuascincus
Reptiles described in 1932
Taxa named by Theodor Vogt